Jason Spagnuolo (born 2 August 1984) is an Australian former professional footballer who last played for Adelaide City in the South Australian Super League.

Club career
Spagnuolo joined Adelaide United as injury cover towards the end of the 2005-06 season where he made one substitute appearance and earned his first professional contract the following season. He was Club Champion in the 2006–07 season after an impressive run of games seeing him contribute seven assists in 21 games. For the next two seasons, injuries restricted his game time and forcing him to play off the bench.

On 25 November 2008, Spagnuolo was released by mutual consent as he was seeking more game time. He signed for North Queensland Fury. After North Queensland Fury folded he returned home and signed with Adelaide City in 2011.

In 2012, he retired from professional/semi-professional football.

References

External links
 North Queensland Fury profile
 Oz Football profile

1984 births
Living people
Soccer players from Adelaide
Australian people of Italian descent
Association football midfielders
Australian soccer players
A-League Men players
FFSA Super League players
Adelaide United FC players
Northern Fury FC players
North Eastern MetroStars SC players